Henrik Greve Hille (1 October 1881 – 31 May 1946) was a Norwegian clergyman. He served as Bishop of the Diocese of Hamar from 1934 to 1942 and again from 1945 until 1946.

Biography
He was born at Vang in Hedmark, Norway. He was the son of Arnoldus Hille and Charlotte Sofie Sandberg (1832-1875). His father served as  bishop in the Diocese of Hamar from 1887 to 1906. He became cand.theol. in 1905. Hille worked as a teacher at Frogner School in Kristiania (now Oslo) from 1906 to 1913. He became an assistant priest at Oslo Cathedral during 1913. In 1918 he became a parish priest at Varteig Church (Varteig Kirke) in Sarpsborg. From 1926 to 1931 he was the resident chaplain at Oslo Cathedral.

He served as bishop at the Diocese of Hamar from 1934 to 1942. During the German occupation of Norway, he was expelled by the Nazi officials in December 1942 and was arrested in 1944. He was returned to the position as bishop after the liberation of Norway in 1945 and died the following year. He was buried at Vestre gravlund in Oslo.

Personal life
Henrik Hille was married to Ragna Erna Bjerke (1894-1990). They were the parents of Arnoldus Marius Hille (born 1919) who became professor at the University of Bergen, Harald Hille (born 1921) who became an architect and Georg Hille (born 1923) who became bishop in Hamar from 1975 to 1993.

References

1881 births
1946 deaths
People from Hedmark
20th-century Norwegian Lutheran clergy
Bishops of Hamar
Norwegian people of World War II
Burials at Vestre gravlund